Agathidium depressum is a species of round fungus beetle in the family Leiodidae. It is found in North America. It feeds on Stemonitis fusca

References

Further reading

 
 
 

Leiodidae
Articles created by Qbugbot
Beetles described in 1934